is a Japanese former Nippon Professional Baseball pitcher.

References 

1958 births
Living people
Baseball people from Fukuoka Prefecture 
Japanese baseball players
Nippon Professional Baseball pitchers
Kintetsu Buffaloes players
Hanshin Tigers players
Japanese baseball coaches
Nippon Professional Baseball coaches